Luiro is a river of Finland. It is a tributary of Kitinen, that itself is a tributary of Kemijoki. The river flows through the municipalities of Sodankylä, Savukoski and Pelkosenniemi in Finnish Lapland. The Lokka Reservoir is located in the middle course of the river.

See also
List of rivers in Finland

Kemijoki basin
Rivers of Sodankylä
Rivers of Finland